Reini is a surname. Notable people with the surname include:

Aarne Reini (1906–1974), Finnish wrestler
Antti Reini (born 1964), Finnish actor
Juha Reini (born 1975), Finnish footballer

See also
Heini
Reinis